The Brethren or Brethren of the Coast were a loose coalition of pirates and privateers commonly known as buccaneers that were active in the seventeenth and eighteenth centuries in the Atlantic Ocean, Caribbean Sea, and Gulf of Mexico. 

They were a syndicate of captains with letters of marque and reprisal who regulated their privateering enterprises within the community of privateers and with their outside benefactors.  They were primarily private individual merchant mariners of Protestant background, usually of English and French origin.  

During their heyday, when the Thirty Years War was devastating the Protestant communities of France, Germany, and the Netherlands while England was engaged in various conflicts, the privateers of these nationalities were issued letters of marque to raid Catholic French and Spanish shipping and territories.  

Based primarily on the island of Tortuga off the coast of Haiti and in the city of Port Royal on the island of Jamaica, the original Brethren were mostly French Huguenot and British Protestants, but their ranks were joined by other adventurers of various nationalities including Spaniards, and even African sailors, as well as escaped slaves, and outlaws of various sovereigns. 

In keeping with their Protestant and mostly common law heritage, the Brethren were governed by codes of conduct that favored legislative decision-making, hierarchical command authority, individual rights, and equitable division of revenues.

Henry Morgan was perhaps the most famous member of the Brethren and the one usually credited with codifying its organization. However, following the demographic changes which featured the rise of slave labor in the Caribbean islands, most maritime families moved to the mainland colonies of the future United States or to their home countries.  A few, unable to compete effectively with slave labor, enamored of easy riches, or out of angst, continued to maintain the Brethren of the Coasts as a purely criminal organization which preyed upon all civilian maritime shipping.  This second era of the Brethren began the age of piracy and brigandage which affected the Caribbean until socioeconomic and military changes of the late 18th and early 19th century finally broke its back. Many pirates made their journeys there, and one of the most famous was Alexandre Exquemelin.

A fictionalized, romanticized version of the Brethren was featured in the Pirates of the Caribbean films.

See also
Piracy in the Caribbean
Pirate Republic
Victual Brothers
Thalassocracy

References
Kemp, Peter Christopher Lloyd. Brethren of the Coast: The British and French Buccaneers of the South Sea. New York: St. Martin, 1960, 1961.
Marx, Jennifer. Pirates and Privateers of the Caribbean. Melbourne, Florida: Krieger, 1992.

Piracy in the Atlantic Ocean
Pirates